The Students' Federation of India (abbreviated as SFI) is an Indian left-wing student organisation politically aligned to the ideologies of independence, democracy and socialism.  Currently, V. P. Sanu and Mayukh Biswas are elected as the All India President and General Secretary, respectively.

History 
The origin of Indian students movement in its organised form can be traced to the formation of All India Students’ Federation (AISF) on 12 August 1936 to further anti-imperialist politics.
Since the 1940s–1950s, several ideological debates fathomed within the AISF, regarding the analysis of the Indian society, the nature of the Indian state and its attitude towards students. A strong body of opinion emerged as to oppose the existing predominant view within the AISF, to cooperate and compromise with the nation's ruling classes towards a so-called progressive end. They called for militancy in student movements, aimed towards a progressive reorientation of the existing education system. As political differences between dissenting factions within the AISF developed, added with their negligence on student issues, it split into several local organizations which started working independently. In 1970, delegates from such organizations held a conference in Thiruvananthapuram to form a new national students' organisation. The All India Conference was held from 27 to 30 December, and resulted in formation of Students' Federation of India. The elected leaderships from the first conference included C. Baskaran, (first President), Biman Bose (first General Secretary), Shyamal Chakraborty, Baldev Singh, Babu Bharadwaj, Ranjan Goswami, Manik Sarkar, N Ram, Subhash Chakraborty, Umendra prasad Singh, P Madhu and Shaktidhar Das.

Presence and structure 
The Students' Federation of India in 202021 has 24 functioning state committees. Since , SFI is one of the major left forces in Delhi University Students Union elections. In 201415, its total membership was 4,300,405. 

SFI has won numerous student union elections in Universities and colleges. SFI leads the student unions in various notable universities across India, including:

Activities

Protest and demands
SFI has protested against the National Education Policy, 2019, hike in fees, and under-representation of reserved students in IITs.

SFI members took part and organised multiple Citizenship Amendment Act protests in 2019. The SFI marched to the Parliament in one such protest. Further, the SFI even approached the Supreme Court against the act.

During the COVID-19 pandemic lockdown in India, SFI distributed sanitary napkins to female students in West Bengal and demanded their inclusion in essential commodities in Himachal Pradesh. SFI set up COVID-19 helpline numbers in various states to help stranded students. To combat misinformation and reach out to the migrant labourers in various places, SFI launched a campaign named "My dear friend" where verified information from government sources are translated into various Indian languages and circulated through social media. Online art festivals, lecture series and online classes were also organised by various SFI committee's. SFI also produced face masks and hand sanitisers.

SFI had won court cases for regulating private coaching centres in India.

SFI and DYFI activists jointly posted 1.5 lakh (150,000) letters to the Prime Minister's office after a first information report (FIR) for sedition was lodged against 49 celebrities who condemned lynchings of Muslims, Dalits, and other minorities in India.

SFI approached Supreme Court seeking directions to provide universal free vaccination to all citizens of India and to waive off the goods and service tax levied on the import of the oxygen concentrators used for personal use during the COVID-19 pandemic.

Red Volunteers and other social works
SFI along with DYFI, the youth wing of Communist Party of India (Marxist), runs Red Volunteers, Sramajibi Canteen and involves in various social works.

Women in SFI
From 27 to 29 January 2017, the 5th All India Girls Convention was held at Vijayawada, Andhra Pradesh and it elected a 23-member team of girls’ sub-committee.

Bleed Without Fear, Bleed Without Tax
Protesting against the imposition of 12% tax on sanitary napkins, the women sub-committee of SFI protested nationwide in July 2017. The campaign was named "Bleed Without Fear, Bleed Without Tax". Petitions were submitted to the Union Finance Minister Arun Jaitley for revoking the government decision. Thousands of girl students mailed sanitary napkins with protest slogans to Arun Jaitley's office. This campaign was similar to that of the Pink Chaddi Campaign in 2009. The campaign also demanded the installation of adequate sanitary napkin vending machines in schools and colleges and providing six packets of sanitary napkins for one rupee to the women below poverty line.

All-women panels
Female candidates of the SFI won all seats in a mixed college by fielding an all-women panel for students union elections in Sree Sankaracharya University of Sanskrit, Kalady in 2017. An SFI member became the first Dalit woman to be elected as the chairperson in Maharaja's College, Ernakulam in 2017.

In 2018, all-women SFI panels won in CMS College Kottayam and contested in Government Victoria College, Palakkad.

In 2019, SFI members were elected as the first female chairpersons in Sacred Heart College, Thevara, Kochi, and the College of Engineering, Trivandrum (CET). Earlier, the SFI had organised protests of the female hostelites of CET in February 2019 for extending the curfew timings for girls' hostels. This movement forced the government to accept the demands and Dr Usha Titus, the Higher Education Secretary of Kerala Government issued orders to enforce them.

GSCASH
The idea of GSCASH (Gender Sensitisation Committee Against Sexual Harassment) was first experimented in Jawaharlal Nehru University by SFI's students union headed by Vijoo Krishnan in 1998–99. In September 2013, after the harassment of two women students of Pondicherry University, the SFI initiated a movement for GSCASH in the university and the activists approached Madras High Court for redressal. The movement later ended successfully with the High Court ordering university to constitute institutional mechanisms for grievances. In Assam, the Directorate of Higher Education (DHE) in 2018 ordered all colleges to set up GSCASH after the SFI's intervention.

LGBTQIA+ issues 
SFI has actively supported LGBTQIA+ rights. SFI was the first student organization in India to nominate an openly gay person for a Student Union election as they nominated Gourab Ghosh for Jawaharlal Nehru University Student Union elections held in 2013 as its candidate for the General Secretary position. SFI has campaigned for LGBTQIA+ rights in college campuses, and has held conventions. In 2016, SFI decided to include the ‘others’ gender option in its membership forms. SFI has supported the scrapping of section 377 and opposes the Transgender Persons Act, 2019 commenting that the Act "infringes on the rights and dignity of transpersons". Prominent LGBTQIA+ persons in SFI include Apratim Roy (first trans SFI West Bengal State committee member), Nandhana (first Transgender member of Thrissur District committee, Kerala), Adam Harry (first transman to become a pilot in India), Muhammed Zuhrabi (queer activist, ex-General Secretary, Pondicherry University Students' Council).

Violence 
There have been several cases of SFI cadres booked for attacks on opponents. In 2017, T Vijayalakshmi, the Director-in-Charge of Students Services of Kerala University, went on indefinite leave, citing death threats received from SFI affiliated students.  In 2019, retired justice PK Shamsudin conducted an informal probe to look into the discrepancies in college campus politics; Shamsudin noted the anti-democratic activities of SFI in Kerala and made a remark of presence of "torture rooms" run by SFI in university spaces. That same year, SFI College Unit members were arrested for stabbing a student at University College. In 2022, videos of the office of an MP from Wayanad Rahul Gandhi being vandalised by SFI members were circulated on social media. The incident was condemned by Kerala Chief Minister Pinarayi Vijayan. In 2022, SFI activists were booked for assault on woman at Government Law College, Trivandrum. In 2023, SFI activists barged into the Asianet News media office in Ernakulam. The activists pushed aside the security guard and displayed banners against the news outlet.

See also 
All India Students Federation
 National Students' Union of India
Akhil Bharatiya Vidyarthi Parishad

References

External links

 

Student organisations in India
1970 establishments in India
Student organizations established in 1970
Communist Party of India (Marxist)
Volunteer organisations in India
Student wings of communist parties of India